Elkhorn is an unincorporated community in McDowell County, West Virginia, United States. Elkhorn lies on U.S. Route 52 and takes its name from the creek that flows through the community.

The John J. Lincoln House was listed on the National Register of Historic Places in 1992.

Notable person

Angie Turner King (1905-2004), chemist, mathematician, and educator, was born in Elkhorn.

Climate
The climate in this area has mild differences between highs and lows, and there is adequate rainfall year-round.  According to the Köppen Climate Classification system, Elkhorn has a marine west coast climate, abbreviated "Cfb" on climate maps.

References 

Unincorporated communities in McDowell County, West Virginia
Unincorporated communities in West Virginia
Coal towns in West Virginia